Gini may refer to:

Gini coefficient (also the Gini index) in economics, an indicator of income equality
G.I.N.I., a predecessor organization to Post-Polio Health International
Gini (soft drink), a French brand of soft drink
A jinni, or djinni or genie, a member of the jinn supernatural beings

People

Given name
Gini Koch, American fantasy/SF writer
Gini Cruz Santos (born 1966), Filipina animator at Pixar
Gini Graham Scott (born 1942), American non-fiction author in various fields 
Gini Reticker, American film director

Surname
Corrado Gini (1884–1965), Italian statistician, demographer, sociologist and developer of the Gini coefficient
Luis Gini (born 1935), Paraguayan footballer
Mahabub Ara Begum Gini (born 1961), Bangladeshi politician
Marc Gini (born 1984), Swiss alpine skier
Maria L. Gini, Italian-American scientist in AI/robotics
Gjini family, prominent Albanian family of the 16th-17th centuries